The canton of Lassay-les-Châteaux is an administrative division of the Mayenne department, northwestern France. Its borders were modified at the French canton reorganisation which came into effect in March 2015. Its seat is in Lassay-les-Châteaux.

It consists of the following communes:
 
Aron
La Bazoge-Montpinçon
Belgeard
Champéon
La Chapelle-au-Riboul
Charchigné
Commer
Grazay
La Haie-Traversaine
Hardanges
Le Horps
Le Housseau-Brétignolles
Jublains
Lassay-les-Châteaux
Marcillé-la-Ville
Martigné-sur-Mayenne
Montreuil-Poulay
Moulay
Rennes-en-Grenouilles
Le Ribay
Sainte-Marie-du-Bois
Saint-Fraimbault-de-Prières
Saint-Julien-du-Terroux
Thubœuf

References

Cantons of Mayenne